FC Khimik Semiluki was a Russian football team from Semiluki. It played professionally in 1989 in the Soviet Second League and in 1990 in the Soviet Second League B.

External links
  Team history by footballfacts

Defunct football clubs in Russia
Sport in Voronezh Oblast